PGA is an acronym or initialism that may stand for:

Aviation 
 IATA code for Page Municipal Airport, Coconino County, Arizona
 ICAO designator for Portugália, regional airline based in Lisbon, Portugal
 Abbreviation for Prince George Airport, British Columbia, Canada

Organizations 
 Parliamentarians for Global Action, an international parliamentary group that engage in a range of action-oriented initiatives.
 Peoples' Global Action, a worldwide co-ordination of radical social movements
 Producers Guild of America, an organization representing television producers, film producers and new media producers in the United States

Golf

Organizations and tours 
 Professional Golfers' Association (Great Britain and Ireland)
 Professional Golfers' Association of America
 PGA Tour, United States-based organization (independent of the PGA of America) that operates men's professional golf tours, and the name of the elite tour it runs
 PGA European Tour, Europe-based organization (independent of the PGA of Great Britain and Ireland) that operates men's professional golf tours
 PGA Tour of Australasia, formerly the PGA Tour of Australia

Tournaments 
PGA Championship, one of the four men's major golf championships, organized by the PGA of America
Women's PGA Championship
Senior PGA Championship
BMW PGA Championship, a professional golf tournament on the European Tour, founded by the PGA of Great Britain and Ireland
PGA Seniors Championship
Australian PGA Championship
New Zealand PGA Championship
South African PGA Championship
Indonesia PGA Championship

Science

Chemistry 
 3-Phosphoglyceric acid (or glycerate 3-phosphate), a chemical substance that is a metabolic intermediate in both glycolysis and the Calvin cycle
 Polyglutamic acid, a polymer of the glutamic acid (one of proteinogenic amino acids)
 Polyglycolic acid, another name for polyglycolide
 Propylene glycol alginate (E405), an emulsifier, stabilizer, and thickener used in food products
 Prostaglandin of the A type

Geology / Seismology 
 Peak ground acceleration, measure of ground acceleration during an earthquake

Language 

 pga, ISO 639-3 language code for Juba Arabic (also known as Sudanese Creole Arabic) language

Mathematics 
 Principal geodesic analysis, a generalization of principal component analysis

Medicine 
 Pentagestrone acetate, a progestin
 Polyglandular autoimmune syndromes, another name for autoimmune polyendocrine syndromes

Technology

Computing 
 Perl Golf Apocalypse, a Perl coding competition
 Program Global Area, a memory region for the server processes in Oracle
 Professional Graphics Adapter or Professional Graphics Array, other names for Professional Graphics Controller, an IBM XT graphics card intended for the CAD market

Electronics 
 Pin grid array, a type of packaging for integrated circuits
 Programmable-gain amplifier, an amplifier whose gain can be changed during its operation
 Programmable gate array, a semiconductor device containing programmable logic components and programmable interconnects (vast majority of today's PGAs are field-programmable gate arrays, or FPGAs)

Other
 Panasonic Gobel Awards, annual Indonesian TV awards, from 1997 until 2019
 Paul Gardner Allen (1953–2018), American business magnate, co-founder of Microsoft
 Pure grain alcohol, another name for neutral grain spirit